Atlanta and West Point 290 is a P-74 steam locomotive built in March 1926 by the Lima Locomotive Works (LLW) in Lima, Ohio for the Atlanta and West Point Railroad. It is a 4-6-2 heavy "Pacific" type steam locomotive, which was remarkably similar to the Southern Railway's Ps-4 class. With sister locomotive, No. 190 built for the Western Railway of Alabama (WRA), the 290 ferried the Southern Railway's Crescent passenger train from Atlanta, Georgia to Montgomery, Alabama until its retirement from revenue service in 1954. The No. 290 locomotive was saved by a group called the 290 Club and was put on static display at the city of Atlanta's Lakewood Park.

In 1961, No. 290 was donated to the Atlanta Chapter of the National Railway Historical Society (NRHS). In 1989, the locomotive was restored to operating condition for the New Georgia Railroad (NGRX) program, running excursion trips all across the Georgia state until late 1992, when it was retired due to running gear issues.

No. 290 is currently dissembled at the Southeastern Railway Museum (SRM) in Duluth, Georgia. With no plans to be restored back to operating condition, the locomotive is stored inside the SRM's backshop, waiting for a full cosmetic restoration.

History

Revenue service
No. 290 along with sister locomotive No. 190, are both heavy P-74 Pacific steam locomotives built in March 1926 by the Lima Locomotive Works in Lima, Ohio. They were based on the USRA Heavy Pacific design and have a very similar appearance to the Southern Railway Ps-4 class. No. 290 was assigned to the Atlanta and West Point Railway (A&WP), while No. 190 served the Western Railway of Alabama (WRA). Both roads were under the common control of the Georgia Railroad and all operated as essentially one railroad, although being legally separate. As a result, it was not uncommon to find one railroad's locomotives on another's line. 

Nos. 190 and 290's job was to ferry the Southern Railway's Crescent passenger train between Atlanta and Montgomery. While one locomotive was traveling southbound with the Crescent, the other would take the northbound counterpart. The locomotives would then be turned around at their terminal point for the reverse run. As a result, it was common to see both locomotives in both Atlanta and Montgomery. However, WRA and A&WP crews would swap in West Point, Georgia where the two lines met. When the train arrived in Montgomery, the Louisville and Nashville Railroad (L&N) would complete the final leg of the Crescent train's journey to New Orleans, Louisiana.

First retirement and attemped lease
In 1954, the No. 190 locomotive was retired and scrapped, but No. 290 was rescued by a group called the 290 Club who persuade the A&WP to donate the latter locomotive for preservation. No. 290 was put on static display at the City of Atlanta's Lakewood Park before it was donated to the Atlanta Chapter, National Railway Historical Society (NRHS) in 1965. During that time, Southern Railway's president W. Graham Claytor Jr. attempted to lease the No. 290 locomotive and significantly alter its appearance by repainting it in Southern's passenger Virginian green and gold paint scheme to resemble a Southern Railway Ps-4 locomotive for use on their steam excursion program. However, the A&WP was not keen on the idea and threaten to sue Claytor from using their No. 290 locomotive.

Excursion service
In 1986, the New Georgia Railroad (NGRX), a sponsored tourist excursion railroad operated by the Georgia Building Authority in Atlanta, restored No. 290 to operating condition in 1989, running excursion trips on Norfolk Southern (NS) and CSX trackage out of Atlanta to Athens, Augusta, Brunswick, Macon, and Savannah, Georgia.

In early 1991, No. 290 was sent to the Norfolk Southern's Norris Yard Steam Shop in Irondale, Alabama to have its crown sheet inspected. Shortly thereafter, the NGRX made an agreement with NS to borrow No. 290 as a substitute to Norfolk and Western 611 and 1218, which were both under maintenance at that time. On April 6 and 7, No. 290 hauled two round trip excursions from Birmingham, Alabama to Chattanooga, Tennessee for the Heart of Dixie Chapter NRHS and the following weekend round trips out of Jacksonville, Florida to Valdosta, Georgia for the North Florida Chapter NRHS. Afterwards, the locomotive returned to the NGRX to continue haul more excursion trips in Georgia. 

On Friday, August 21, 1992, No. 290 ran the highly anticipated excursion trip from Atlanta, Georgia to Montgomery, Alabama for the Atlanta Chapter NRHS on both ex-A&WP and WRA rails, via CSX. On the next day, No. 290 ran five round-trip excursions out of Montgomery to Dothan, Alabama before returning to Atlanta on August 23. By the end of 1992, No. 290 was taken out of service for extensive repair work to its running gear.

Second retirement
There were originally plans to have the No. 290 locomotive be ready in time for the 1994 Atlanta Chapter NRHS convention, but the NGRX program was shut down due to its sponsorship with the Georgia state government being discontinued. Additionally, both NS and CSX railroads banned main line steam excursion trips on their trackage the following year due to liability insurance. The No. 290 locomotive is currently disassembled inside the Southeastern Railway Museum's backshop in Duluth, Georgia, waiting for a full cosmetic restoration. There are currently no plans to restore the locomotive back to operating condition again. Therefore, it will be put back on display once the cosmetic restoration work is finished.

In popular culture
In 1991, No. 290 made its first ever film appearance in the comedy-drama film, Fried Green Tomatoes, starring Kathy Bates and Mary Stuart Masterson.

See also
Atlantic Coast Line 1504
Florida East Coast 153
Norfolk and Western 578
Reading and Northern 425
Southern Pacific 2467
Southern Pacific 2472
Southern Pacific 2479
Southern Railway 1401
U.S. Sugar 148

References

Bibliography

Further reading

External links

 Southeastern Railway Museum Locomotives

Individual locomotives of the United States
4-6-2 locomotives
Atlanta and West Point Railroad
Lima locomotives
Preserved steam locomotives of Georgia
Railway locomotives introduced in 1926
Standard gauge locomotives of the United States